Ángela Indira Evans (born 21 July 1993) is a Panamanian footballer who plays as a forward for Irish Women's National League club Kilkenny United WFC and the Panama women's national team.

See also
 List of Panama women's international footballers

References

1993 births
Living people
Panamanian women's footballers
Women's association football forwards
Panama women's international footballers
Pan American Games competitors for Panama
Footballers at the 2019 Pan American Games
Competitors at the 2022 World Games
World Games bronze medalists
20th-century Panamanian women
21st-century Panamanian women